Veljko Nikitović (Serbian Cyrillic: Beљкo Hикитoвић ; born 3 October 1980 in Belgrade) is a Serbian retired footballer.

Career

Club
In February 2004, he joined Górnik Łęczna from FK Hajduk Beograd.

In the Summer 2007, he moved to FC Vaslui.

In February 2008, he returned to Górnik Łęczna and signed three and a half year contract.

References

External links
 

1980 births
Living people
Serbian footballers
Serbian expatriate footballers
Association football midfielders
Ekstraklasa players
Górnik Łęczna players
FC Vaslui players
Expatriate footballers in Romania
Liga I players
Expatriate footballers in Poland
Serbian expatriate sportspeople in Poland